Malone is a town in  Franklin County, New York, United States. The population was 14,545 at the 2010 census. The town contains a village also named Malone. The town is an interior town located in the north-central part of the county.

History 

The town was formed from part of the town of Chateaugay in 1805. The town was originally named "Harison", after Richard Harison, who had purchased the land and founded the town. The name was changed in 1808 to "Ezraville", after Ezra L'Hommedieu, and in 1812 to "Malone".

During the War of 1812, the village was sacked by British troops making incursions from what would become Canada.

Former Governor Mario Cuomo instituted financial measures to increase economic stability to the county by bringing in many prisons (state and federal).

Between 1901 and 1958, a commuter train service run by the New York Central Railroad connected Malone with Montreal, Quebec.

Notable people

Michael Hastings (1980–2013), investigative journalist
 Frank Fitzsimmons (born 1956), appointed by the Clinton administration in 1998 as a founding board member of the non-profit  ICANN (Internet Corporation for Assigned Names and Numbers) which administers the Internet infrastructure. https://www.icann.org/en/board/directors?display=all
Bob Mould (born 1960), solo musician and former guitarist, singer, and songwriter with alternative rock bands Hüsker Dü and Sugar
Clarence E. Kilburn (1893–1975), Republican member of the United States House of Representatives
William H. Flack (1861–1907), US congressman
Alexander Duane (1858–1926), ophthalmologist
Almanzo Wilder (1857–1949), husband of Little House on the Prairie author Laura Ingalls Wilder
Orville Gibson (1856–1911), founder of  Gibson Guitar Corporation
Frank Tolan (1854–99), recipient of the Medal of Honor for actions at the Battle of the Little Bighorn
William H. Huntington (1848–1916), former Wisconsin State Assemblyman
Ovila Cayer (1844–1909), recipient of the Medal of Honor for actions during the Battle of Globe Tavern
Charles L. Russell (1844–1910), recipient of the Medal of Honor for actions during the Battle of Spotsylvania Court House
Philip Woolley (1831–1912), Canadian American businessman
William A. Wheeler (1819–87), the 19th Vice President of the United States, serving under Rutherford B. Hayes. Buried at Morningside Cemetery in Malone, his mansion on Elm Street is now the site of the Elks Lodge

Geography

U.S. Route 11 and New York State Route 11B are east-west highways across the town, and New York State Route 30 and New York State Route 37 are north-south highways.

The Salmon River flows northward through the center of town, and the Trout River flows across the northeastern corner.

Climate

According to the Köppen Climate Classification system, Malone has a warm-summer humid continental climate, abbreviated "Dfb" on climate maps.

Demographics

At the 2000 census there were 14,981 people, 4,114 households, and 2,620 families in the town.  The population density was 147.1 people per square mile (56.8/km).  There were 4,644 housing units at an average density of 45.6 per square mile (17.6/km).  The ethnic makeup of the town was 73.61% White, 18.56% Black or African American, 0.49% Native American, 0.63% Asian, 6.25% from other races, and 0.45% from two or more races. Hispanic or Latino of any race were 11.19%. Malone, New York has a far more diverse demographic profile compared to the surrounding region, due to hosting multiple state correctional facilities, which house prisoners from the entirety of New York state. Malone also hosts the county correctional facility for Franklin County.

Of the 4,114 households 30.2% had children under the age of 18 living with them, 46.5% were married couples living together, 12.7% had a female householder with no husband present, and 36.3% were non-families. 30.7% of households were one person and 14.3% were one person aged 65 or older.  The average household size was 2.36 and the average family size was 2.91.

The age distribution was 16.3% under the age of 18, 10.4% from 18 to 24, 42.1% from 25 to 44, 19.2% from 45 to 64, and 12.1% 65 or older.  The median age was 36 years. For every 100 females, there were 179.4 males.  For every 100 females age 18 and over, there were 201.5 males.

The median household income was $27,716 and the median family income  was $37,500. Males had a median income of $25,996 versus $20,506 for females. The per capita income for the town was $17,352.

According to  the Census 2017 ACS 5Year Estimates, the poverty rate in Malone is 24%. The child poverty rate is 31%. (A previous statistic here said the poverty rate was only 8%).

Communities and locations in the Town of Malone
Bare Hill Correctional Facility – a New York state medium security state prison
Chasm Falls – a hamlet in the southeastern part of the town on County Road 25; originally called Titusville
Fay – a hamlet by the northern town line
Franklin Correctional Facility – a New York state medium security state prison 
Lake Titus – a lake in the southwestern part of the town
Malone – a village located in the center of the town and the county seat of Franklin County
Malone-Dufort Airport (MAL) – an airport west of the village of Malone 
Malone Junction – a hamlet northeast of the village of Malone 
Teboville – a hamlet in the central part of the town, east of Whippleville
Upstate Correctional Facility – a New York state maximum security state prison
Whippleville – a hamlet in the central part of the town, located south of the village of Malone on County Road 25

References

External links

 
  Early Malone history
  Malone Historical Map Online
  Read and Listen to the oral history of Malone in the late 19th early 20th Centuries

Populated places established in 1805
Towns in Franklin County, New York
1805 establishments in New York (state)